Bethel Christian School is an independent non-denominational Christian co-educational primary and secondary day school, located in Albany, Western Australia, catering for boys and girls from kindergarten to Year 12.

See also
 
List of schools in rural Western Australia

References

Private secondary schools in Western Australia
Nondenominational Christian schools in Western Australia
Educational institutions established in 1981
Great Southern (Western Australia)
1981 establishments in Australia
Private primary schools in Western Australia